Megan McJames (born September 24, 1987, in Park City, Utah) is an American alpine skier. She began skiing at age 2 and joined the Park City Ski Team at age 8. She attended The Winter Sports School in Park City, graduating in 2005.  In 2008, she was the NorAm GS champion.

She was named to the US team at the 2010 Winter Olympics and 2014 Winter Olympics.

References

External links

 

Alpine skiers at the 2010 Winter Olympics
Alpine skiers at the 2014 Winter Olympics
Alpine skiers at the 2018 Winter Olympics
American female alpine skiers
Olympic alpine skiers of the United States
People from Park City, Utah
1987 births
Living people